is a district of Shibuya, Tokyo, Japan. Abutting Ebisu, Minami-Azabu, Nishi-Azabu and Minami-Aoyama, Hiroo is an upmarket residential and shopping neighborhood in central Tokyo.

As of October, 2020, the population of this district is 15,263. The postal code for Hiroo is 150-0012.

According to the Ministry of Land, Infrastructure and Transport, as of 2020, the residential land prices on Hiroo 2-chōme and 3-chōme are as high as ¥1,350,000/m2 and ¥1,260,000/m2, respectively.

Located on Minami-Azabu, the Hiroo Station of Tokyo Metro Hibiya Line is the nearest subway station to Hiroo.

Geography 
Hiroo is located in the southeast area of the district of Shibuya, Tokyo, Japan. The boundaries of Hiroo are Nishi-Azabu, Minato and Minami-Aoyama, Minato to the north and follows the Shibuya River along the south. Minami-Azabu, Minato is located to the east and Higashi, Shibuya is located to the west.

Education

Tertiary education
There are two universities in Hiroo. The University of the Sacred Heart, successor to the Sacred Heart Koto Senmon School which was established in 1916 and reorganized into a university with the current name in 1948, is one of the oldest women's universities in Japan. Its important alumnae include the former UN High Commissioner for Refugees Sadako Ogata and Empress of Japan Michiko. One of the two campuses of the Japanese Red Cross College of Nursing is also located in Hiroo. Although reorganized into a four-year college recently in 1986, the origin of the nursing school dates back to 1890, when nursing education was launched at the Japanese Red Cross Hospital. The university offers education to women in Japanese.

Primary and secondary schools

 operates public elementary and junior high schools.

Hiroo 1-chome 1-8 and 11-16 ban, 2-chome 1-9 ban, and 3-chome 2-3 and 8-17 ban are zoned to Hiroo Elementary School (広尾小学校). Hiroo 4-5 chome, 1-chome 9-10 ban, and 2-chome 10-22 ban are zoned to Rinsen Elementary School (臨川小学校). Hiroo 3-chome 1 and 4-7-ban are zoned to Tokiwamatsu Elementary School (常磐松小学校).

Hiroo 1-2 and 4-5 chome and 3-chome 2, 3, and 8-17 ban are zoned to Hiroo Junior High School (広尾中学校). Hiroo 3-chome 1 and 4-7 ban are zoned to Hachiyama Junior High School (鉢山中学校).

Schools in Hiroo:
 Hiroo Elementary School (Hiroo Shōgakkō)
 Rinsen Elementary School, a public elementary school.
 Tokyo Jogakkan Elementary, Junior and Senior High School, a private girls school.
 Keio Gijyuku Yōchisha, a private　elementary school, affiliated with Keio University. It is located in Tengenji Bridge (Tengenji-Bashi).
 Hiroo is also home to the International School of the Sacred Heart which was founded in 1908 and is located on the same grounds as the University of the Sacred Heart (Seishin Joshi Daigaku).  It offers education in English for girls from the ages of three to eighteen.  
 There are several Japanese high schools in the area as well, including Hiroo Senior High School (Hiroo Kōtōgakkō)
 The Rainbow International Montessori School also has a facility located in the same area.

Demography

Attractions

Adjacent to Hiroo, the district of Minami-Azabu is home to Arisugawa Park, which spans through a large chunk of the town. The park consists of several paths and walkways, a baseball field, soccer field, children's amusement areas and a man-made waterfall that empties into a pond full of koi and ducks. The park is situated in the close vicinity of Hiroo Station, causing it to be often incorrectly regarded as "a park in Hiroo."

Foreign Embassies 
Hiroo is home to several embassies: Embassy of Peru, Croatia, Czech Republic, Burkina Faso, Tajikistan, Congo, and Oman. Hiroo Station is the nearest subway station to several prominent embassies in Minato: Embassy of France, Germany, Norway, and Pakistan.

New Sanno Hotel 

The New Sanno Hotel is a short-term accommodation facility operated by the U.S. Navy. While the hotel technically is located in Minami-Azabu, it is nearby the Hiroo subway station and Tengenji Bridge. The hotel opened in 1983 after moving from a location nearby Akasaka Mitsuke Station. The large number of daily visitors to the hotel contributes to the international atmosphere in Hiroo.

Tsukushigahara 
In the Edo period, the area near present-day Tokyo Metropolitan Hiroo Hospital, Keio Gijyuku Yochisha School, Tengenji Bridge, and Tokyo Metropolitan Hiroo 5-chome Apartments was named Tsukushigahara. At the time, this area was a large flatland of susuki grass (miscanthus sinensis). Tsukushigahara was a popular strolling and play area and was recorded in the Illustrated Collection of Famous Places in Edo (江戸名所図会).

Hiroo 5-chome Shopping Street Town 
The area surrounding the present-day Hiroo 5-chome shopping street town was designated a shopping street town in Shotoku 3 (1713). This area survived the destruction of the Bombing of Tokyo in 1944-1945. As a result, many Meiji period and Taisho period buildings can still be found in the area. The area is locally known for its nostalgic atmosphere.

Tengenji Bridge 

Tengenji Bridge (天現寺橋) is located at the intersection of Gaien-Nishi-dori and Meiji-dori in Hiroo 5-chome. The bridge spans the confluence of the Shibuya River and the Kogai River. The Kogai River flows completely underground since it was covered by concrete. The Kogai River flows under Gaien-Nishi Dori upstream towards and past the east side of Aoyama Cemetery. Two springs known to still flow into the Kogai River are located at the ponds of Arisugawa Park and the ponds at the Nezu Museum. The Tengenji Bridge is an old bridge and existed long before it was mentioned in a text named Gofunaienkakuzsho (御府内沿革図書) published in Bunkyu 3 (1863).

Facilities 

 Tokyo Metropolitan Hiroo Hospital, located in Ebisu.
 Japanese Red Cross Medical Center
 Aiiku Hospital, located in Minami-Azabu.
 Japanese Red Cross College of Nursing
 University of the Sacred Heart (Japan)
 International School of the Sacred Heart
 Arisugawa-no-miya Memorial Park, located in Minami-Azabu.
 Tokyo Metropolitan Central Library, located at the center of the Arisugawa-no-miya Memorial Park in Minami-Azabu.
 Embassy of Croatia
 Embassy of Czech Republic
 Embassy of Burkina Faso
 Embassy of Oman
 Embassy of Peru
 Ebasssy of Tajikistan
 Embassy of Congo
 New Sanno Hotel
 Hiroo Garden Hills
 Hiroo Plaza
 Tengenji Bridge (Tengenji-Bashi)
 Yamatane Museum of Art
 Hanezawa Garden (Demolished in 2012)
 Ebisu Prime Square

References

Neighborhoods of Tokyo
Shibuya